Aristo Sham (born 12 March 1996) is a pianist born in Hong Kong. He has won numerous prizes and awards in Hong Kong and overseas, and has performed in several countries. He has been featured in the Channel 4 programme, The World's Greatest Musical Prodigies.

Education 
Sham attended Diocesan Boys' School (Primary) in Hong Kong before attending Harrow School in London. He began piano lessons at the age of three, and since then, has captured an impressive array of awards on the international stage. Sham has been a laureate at the Gina Bachauer International Junior Piano Competition, Minnesota International Piano-e-Competition, PianoArts Competition, and many others. He has collaborated with numerous orchestras, including the Milwaukee Symphony Orchestra, Minnesota Orchestra, Hong Kong Philharmonic, English Chamber Orchestra, and the Orchestral at Temple Square in Salt Lake City. Sham has also performed for numerous heads of state, including the Queen of Belgium and former Chinese President Hu Jintao.

He graduated from Harrow School in 2015. He is currently enrolled in the dual-program between New England Conservatory and Harvard University. Sham currently studies with Dr. Victor Rosenbaum.

Awards
 First Prize of the Gina Bachauer International Junior Piano Competition in 2008;
 First Prize of the 4th China National Junior Piano Competition
 First Prize of Category A and the Barenreiter Urtext Special Prize of the 10th Ettlingen International Piano Competition for Young Pianists in Germany in 2006 
 Grand Champion of the Hong Kong Young Musician of the Year 2006;
 First Prize in Group A of the 69th Steinway International Children and Youth Piano Competition in Beijing
 Gold Medal Award of Hong Kong Schools Music Festival in 2008.
 Prodigies and Masters of Tomorrow of the Miami Piano Festival in Miami.
 First Prize in the 69th Steinway International Children & Youth Piano Competition Group A (China Regional final), Beijing (2005)
 Grand Prize in The Hong Kong Young Musician of the Year, Hong Kong (2006)
 First Prize in the Mozart Sonata Group of the 3rd Asian Youth Music Competition, Shanghai (2006)
 Young Artiste Award, Hong Kong (2007)
 Outstanding Teen Award, Hong Kong (2008)
 First Prize, Schubert Prize, and Variations Prize at Minnesota International Piano-e-Competition 2011
 First Prize in the inaugural Viseu International Piano Competition 2015
 First Prize in the Wideman International Piano Competition in 2015.
 First Prize at PianoArts Competition 2016

References

External links 
 Hong Kong Academy for Performing Arts

Living people
1996 births
People educated at Harrow School
Hong Kong pianists
21st-century pianists